Sandy Powell  (born 7 April 1960) is a British costume designer. She has been nominated for the Academy Award for Best Costume Design fifteen times, winning three awards for the films Shakespeare in Love (1998), The Aviator (2004), and The Young Victoria (2009). She has also received fifteen BAFTA Award nominations, winning for Velvet Goldmine (1998), The Young Victoria, and The Favourite (2018). Powell has been a frequent collaborator with directors Martin Scorsese and Todd Haynes, having designed the costumes for seven of Scorsese's films and four of Haynes's.

Early life 
Powell was born in London in 1960, and grew up in Brixton and Clapham. Her father worked in casinos, while her mother was a secretary. Powell learned to sew from her mother on a Singer sewing machine, drew pictures of clothes, designed and made outfits for her dolls, and started making her own clothes from a young age. She also developed an interest in film and theatre from an early age.

Powell attended Sydenham High School, and in 1978 she completed an art foundation course at Saint Martin's School of Art, where she became acquainted with Lea Anderson, who later became a dancer and choreographer as well as Powell's collaborator. In 1979, Powell began a BA in theatre design at the Central School of Art and Design, but left after two years before completing her degree and started working for fringe theatre companies.

Career 

After leaving Central, Powell began a working relationship with dancer and choreographer Lindsay Kemp, whom she greatly admired. She designed costumes for his productions, the first of which was the show Nijinsky at La Scala in Milan. In the early 1980s, Powell became acquainted with filmmaker Derek Jarman, who became a mentor and an influential figure in her life. Following Jarman's advice, she spent a year working on music videos. She made her entry into the film industry in 1986, designing costumes for the Jarman film Caravaggio.

In 1992, Powell achieved prominence in the period drama film Orlando, directed by Sally Potter. Operating on a limited budget, Powell created elaborate costumes for the gender-switching and time-traveling protagonist (played by Tilda Swinton), for which she received her first Academy Award nomination for Best Costume Design. Powell also began a collaboration with director Neil Jordan, which would produce a total of five films including The Crying Game (1992), Interview with the Vampire (1994) and Michael Collins (1996).

Powell received dual nominations at the 71st Academy Awards for her two 1998 films, Velvet Goldmine and Shakespeare in Love. Echoing the contemporary tone of Shakespeare in Love, Powell opted to sacrifice historical accuracy in her costume designs but still managed to achieve "emotional accuracy", according to Salon critic Stephanie Zacharek. The detail on the costumes of Gwyneth Paltrow's Viola and the thematic significance of her costume changes were also noted as highlights of the film. For her work in the film, Powell won her first Academy Award for Best Costume Design.

Following her win at the 71st Academy Awards, Powell began her collaboration with director Martin Scorsese, starting with his 2002 epic period drama film Gangs of New York, for which she earned her 5th Oscar nomination. The two reunited for the 2004 biographical drama film The Aviator, for which Powell won her second Academy Award.

In 2010, Powell won her third costume design Oscar for her work in the film The Young Victoria.
 
Powell was appointed Officer of the Order of the British Empire (OBE) in the 2011 New Year Honours for her services to the film industry.

In 2016, Powell received her second dual nominations at the 88th Academy Awards, having been recognized for her works in Kenneth Branagh's Disney live-action adaptation of Cinderella and Todd Haynes' Carol.

In 2019, Powell garnered her third dual nominations at the 91st Academy Awards for her works in Yorgos Lanthimos' The Favourite and Rob Marshall's Mary Poppins Returns, making her the most nominated costume designer in Academy Awards history after Edith Head.

In 2020, Powell received her 15th Oscar nomination in her seventh collaboration with Martin Scorsese in his epic crime film The Irishman, for which she shared the nomination with her co-designer, Christopher Peterson. At the same year, Powell collected many stars' signatures on a cream calico suit in a widely publicized tour of 2020 awards ceremonies, including the 92nd Academy Awards and 73rd British Academy Film Awards, to be auctioned to raise funds for the preservation of director Derek Jarman's home, Prospect Cottage.

Film credits

Accolades

Academy Awards

British Academy Film Awards

Costume Designers Guild Awards

Critics' Choice Movie Awards

Satellite Awards

Saturn Awards

References

External links 

Sandy Powell's Instagram page
Sandy Powell's vintage clothes, with all proceeds going to domestic abuse charity, Refuge

1960 births
Alumni of Saint Martin's School of Art
Best Costume Design Academy Award winners
Best Costume Design BAFTA Award winners
British costume designers
Designers from London
Living people
Officers of the Order of the British Empire
People educated at Sydenham High School
People from Brixton
Women costume designers